The 1999 Masters Tournament was the 63rd Masters Tournament, held from April 8–11 at Augusta National Golf Club in Augusta, Georgia. José María Olazábal won his second Masters championship, two strokes ahead of runner-up Davis Love III and three strokes ahead of Greg Norman, who experienced another disappointing back nine at Augusta.

Course

Field
1. Masters champions
Tommy Aaron, Seve Ballesteros, Gay Brewer, Billy Casper, Charles Coody, Fred Couples (10,13,14,15,16), Ben Crenshaw, Nick Faldo, Raymond Floyd, Doug Ford, Bernhard Langer (15,16), Sandy Lyle, Larry Mize, José María Olazábal (10,15,16), Mark O'Meara (3,12,14,15,16), Arnold Palmer, Gary Player, Craig Stadler, Tom Watson (13,14,15,16), Tiger Woods (10,13,14,15,16), Ian Woosnam (10,15), Fuzzy Zoeller
George Archer, Jack Burke Jr., Bob Goalby, Herman Keiser, Byron Nelson, Jack Nicklaus (10), Gene Sarazen, Sam Snead, and Art Wall Jr. did not play.

2. U.S. Open champions (last five years)
Ernie Els (10,13,15,16), Lee Janzen (14,15,16), Steve Jones (13,15), Corey Pavin

3. The Open champions (last five years)
John Daly, Tom Lehman (11,14,15,16), Justin Leonard (5,10,14,15,16), Nick Price (4,11,12,13,14,15,16)

4. PGA champions (last five years)
Mark Brooks, Steve Elkington (5,12,13,15,16), Davis Love III (12,13,14,15,16), Vijay Singh (13,14,15,16)

5. The Players Championship winners (last three years)
David Duval (10,11,13,14,15,16)

6. U.S. Amateur champion and runner-up
Hank Kuehne (a), Tom McKnight (a)

7. The Amateur champion
Sergio García (a)

8. U.S. Amateur Public Links champion
Trevor Immelman (a)

9. U.S. Mid-Amateur champion
Spider Miller (a)

10. Top 24 players and ties from the 1998 Masters
Paul Azinger (11), Mark Calcavecchia (14,15,16), Stewart Cink (11,15,16), Darren Clarke (15,16), Jim Furyk (11,13,14,15,16), Jay Haas, Scott Hoch (14,15,16), John Huston (13,14,15,16), Per-Ulrik Johansson, Matt Kuchar (a) (11), Jeff Maggert (11,13,14,15,16), Scott McCarron, Phil Mickelson (11,13,14,15,16), Colin Montgomerie (15,16), David Toms, Willie Wood

11. Top 16 players and ties from the 1998 U.S. Open
Stuart Appleby (13,15,16), Jesper Parnevik (14,15,16), Jeff Sluman (13,14,15,16), Payne Stewart (13,14,15,16), Steve Stricker (12,14,15,16), Bob Tway (14,15,16), Lee Westwood (15,16)

12. Top eight players and ties from 1998 PGA Championship
Frank Lickliter, Billy Mayfair (13,14,15,16)

13. Winners of PGA Tour events since the previous Masters
Billy Andrade, Olin Browne, Brandel Chamblee, John Cook (14,15,16), Trevor Dodds, Joe Durant, Fred Funk (14,16), J. P. Hayes, Tim Herron, Gabriel Hjertstedt, Rocco Mediate, Steve Pate, Chris Perry, Hal Sutton (14,15,16)

14. Top 30 players from the 1998 PGA Tour money list
Glen Day (15,16), Bob Estes (15,16), Andrew Magee (15,16), Scott Verplank (15,16)

15. Top 50 players from the final 1998 world ranking
Thomas Bjørn (16), Brad Faxon (16), Carlos Franco (16), Bill Glasson (16), Brandt Jobe (16), Shigeki Maruyama (16), Greg Norman (16), Masashi Ozaki (16), Loren Roberts (16), Brian Watts (16)

16. Top 50 players from world ranking published March 7
Craig Parry

17. Special foreign invitation
Miguel Ángel Jiménez, Patrik Sjöland

All the amateurs except Matt Kuchar and John Miller were playing in their first Masters, as were Thomas Bjørn, Brandel Chamblee, Glen Day, Trevor Dodds, Joe Durant, Carlos Franco, J. P. Hayes, Brandt Jobe, Frank Lickliter, Patrik Sjöland and Brian Watts.

Round summaries

First round
Thursday, April 8, 1999
& Friday, April 9, 1999

The first round was suspended by darkness due to earlier rain delays and completed on the following day.

Second round
Friday, April 9, 1999

Amateurs: García (+3), McKnight (+3), Immelman (+4), Kuchar (+4), Kuehne (+8), Miller (+18).

Third round
Saturday, April 10, 1999

Final round
Sunday, April 11, 1999

Final leaderboard

Sources:

Scorecard
Final round

Cumulative tournament scores, relative to par
{|class="wikitable" span = 50 style="font-size:85%;
|-
|style="background: Red;" width=10|
|Eagle
|style="background: Pink;" width=10|
|Birdie
|style="background: PaleGreen;" width=10|
|Bogey
|style="background: Green;" width=10|
|Double bogey
|}
Source:

References

External links
Masters.com – Past winners and results
Augusta.com – 1999 Masters leaderboard and scorecards
Full results

1999
1999 in golf
1999 in American sports
1999 in sports in Georgia (U.S. state)
April 1999 sports events in the United States